Nanyun Township (also spelt Namyung) is a township located within the Naga Self-Administered Zone of the Sagaing Region, Myanmar. It is also part of the Naga Self-Administered Zone. The principal town is Nanyun.

References

Townships of Sagaing Region